Hernando Village Airpark  is a privately owned, public use airport in DeSoto County, Mississippi, United States. It is located two nautical miles (4 km) southwest of the central business district of Hernando, Mississippi. The airport is part of the Green Village Residential Airpark in Hernando.

History 
Hernando Village Airpark opened in 1988 by Diane and Bill Hawks of Mississippi. Their plan was to have a fly-in community, and, along with it, a place where pilots could taxi in along the grass strip runway and park their planes in a hangar on their own property.

Facilities and aircraft 
Hernando Village Airpark, Inc Airport covers an area of 40 acres (16 ha) at an elevation of 242 feet (74 m) above mean sea level. It has one runway designated 14/32 with a turf surface measuring 3,340 by 65 feet (1,018 x 20 m).

The Avgas and tie-down spaces are administered by the owner of Hernando Village Airpark.

For the 12-month period ending October 2, 2012, the airport had 2,970 aircraft operations, an average of 247 per month: 98% general aviation and 2% military. At that time there were 12 aircraft based at this airport: 92% single-engine and 8% multi-engine.

References

External links 
 Aerial image as of March 1996 from USGS The National Map
 

 

Airports in Mississippi
Transportation in DeSoto County, Mississippi
Buildings and structures in DeSoto County, Mississippi
Residential airparks